During the 2012–13 season AFC Ajax will participate in the Eredivisie, the KNVB Cup, and the UEFA Champions League. The first training took place on Tuesday 26 June 2012. The traditional AFC Ajax Open Day was held on Wednesday 27 June 2012.

Pre-season
The first training for the 2012–13 season was held on 26 June 2012. In preparation for the new season Ajax organized a training stage in De Lutte, Netherlands. The squad from manager Frank de Boer stayed there from 2 July 2012 to 7 July 2012. During this training stage friendly matches were played against SV Huizen, VV Oldenzaal and FC Emmen. Further friendly matches were played against SC Veendam, VV Noordwijk, Celtic, Southampton and Norwich City.

Player statistics 
Appearances for competitive matches only

|-
|colspan="14"|Players sold or loaned out after the start of the season:

|}
Updated 4 July 2012

2012–13 Selection by Nationality

Team statistics

Eredivisie standings 2012–13

Points by match day

Total points by match day

Standing by match day

Goals by match day

Statistics for the 2012–13 season
This is an overview of all the statistics for played matches in the 2012–13 season.

2012–13 Team records

Topscorers

Placements

 Daley Blind is voted Player of the year by the supporters of AFC Ajax.
 Viktor Fischer is voted Talent of the year by the supporters of AFC Ajax.
 Frank de Boer is winner of the Rinus Michels Award 2013 in the category: Best Trainer/Coach in Professional Football.
 Niklas Moisander is voted Finnish Footballer of the Year: 2012 by the Football Association of Finland.
 Niklas Moisander is voted Finnish Sports' Journalists Player of the Year: 2012
 Viktor Fischer is voted Danish Talent of the Year by the Danish Football Association and TV2.
 Christian Eriksen wins the Silver boots award.

Pre-season and friendlies

Competitions
All times are in CEST

Johan Cruyff Shield

Eredivisie

KNVB Cup

UEFA Champions League

Group stage

UEFA Europa League

Knockout phase

Round of 32

Transfers for 2012–13

Summer transfer window
For a list of all Dutch football transfers in the summer window (1 July 2012 to 31 August 2012) please see List of Dutch football transfers summer 2012.

Arrivals 
 The following players moved to AFC Ajax.

Departures 
 The following players moved from AFC Ajax.

Winter transfer window 
For a list of all Dutch football transfers in the winter window (1 January 2013 to 1 February 2013) please see List of Dutch football transfers winter 2012–13.

Arrivals 
 The following players moved to AFC Ajax.

Departures 
 The following players moved from AFC Ajax.

External links 
Ajax Amsterdam Official Website in Nederlandse
UEFA Website

Ajax
AFC Ajax seasons
Ajax
Dutch football championship-winning seasons